Walter Charles Wheeler (30 December 1841 – 10 October 1907) was an English first-class cricketer. He was a right-handed batsman who bowled right-arm roundarm medium pace

Wheeler made his first-class debut for Middlesex in a single first-class match in 1873 against Surrey, where he claimed two wickets.

In 1874, Wheeler represented the Players of the South cricket team. In 1875, he joined Surrey, making his debut for the club against Cambridge University. Wheeler represented Surrey in five first-class matches in 1875. Wheeler's final appearance for the county came against Gloucestershire. He took five wickets for Surrey at a bowling average of 17.60, with his best bowling figures of 2/10.

In 1878, Wheeler joined Hampshire, making his debut for the club against Kent, where on debut he is maiden and only five wicket haul with figures of 6/133. He played one more first-class match for Hampshire in 1878, against Derbyshire.

Wheeler played his final first-class matches for Hampshire in 1880 against Sussex. He took six wickets for Hampshire at a bowling average of 31.00. All six of his wickets for the club came in the above-mentioned match against Kent.

Wheeler died at Kennington, London on 10 October 1907, aged 65.

External links
Walter Wheeler at Cricinfo
CricketArchive profile

1841 births
1907 deaths
People from Newport, Isle of Wight
Sportspeople from the Isle of Wight
English cricketers
Middlesex cricketers
Surrey cricketers
Hampshire cricketers
Players of the South cricketers